Jorge de Frutos Sebastián (born 20 February 1997) is a Spanish professional footballer who plays for Levante UD as a winger.

Club career
Born in Navares de Enmedio, Segovia, Castile and León, de Frutos represented CDP Sepúlveda, CD Cantalejo and CF Rayo Majadahonda as a youth. Promoted to the latter's main squad ahead of the 2016–17 season, he made his senior debut on 20 August 2016 by coming on as a second-half substitute in a 0–0 Segunda División B away draw against Sestao River Club.

De Frutos scored his first senior goal on 29 October 2016, netting the game's only in an away defeat of Gernika Club. He became a regular starter during the 2017–18 campaign, appearing in 34 matches and scoring nine goals as his side achieved promotion to Segunda División for the first time ever; highlights included braces against Gimnástica Segoviana CF and Racing de Ferrol.

On 1 May 2018, de Frutos agreed to a pre-contract with Real Madrid, effective as of 1 July; upon arriving, he was assigned to the reserves also in the third division. On 25 June of the following year, he moved to La Liga side Real Valladolid on loan for the season.

De Frutos made his professional debut on 20 October 2019, replacing Javi Moyano in a 1–1 away draw against Athletic Bilbao. The following 17 January, after only three league appearances, he moved to Segunda División side Rayo Vallecano also in a temporary deal.

On 29 July 2020, de Frutos agreed to a five-year deal with Levante UD in the top tier.

References

External links
Real Madrid profile

1997 births
Living people
Sportspeople from the Province of Segovia
Spanish footballers
Footballers from Castile and León
Association football wingers
La Liga players
Segunda División players
Segunda División B players
CF Rayo Majadahonda players
Real Madrid Castilla footballers
Real Valladolid players
Rayo Vallecano players
Levante UD footballers